Lyndon Arthur (born 13 June 1991) is an English professional boxer. At regional level, he held the Commonwealth light-heavyweight title from 2019 to 2021.

Amateur career
As an amateur, Arthur had around 50 bouts and fought out of Collyhurst & Moston ABC. He competed in multiple national championships, including the 2012-13 ABA National Development Championships at 86 kg, losing out to Jermaine Kelly in the final. At 81 kg, he won the 2013-14 ABA Senior Development Championships and reached the finals of the 2014 and 2016 ABA Elite Championships, losing out to Joshua Buatsi and Tom Whittaker-Hart respectively. In 2016 he also fought in the World Series of Boxing for the British Lionhearts.

Professional boxing career 

Arthur made his professional debut on 24 September 2016 at the Manchester Arena, Manchester, scoring a four-round points decision victory over Andy Neylon.

On 4 November 2017, he gained a disqualification (DQ) win over Tayar Mehmed at the Bowlers Exhibition Centre in Manchester. After being repeatedly warned for spitting out his gum-shield, referee Darren Sarginson disqualified Mehmed in the fifth-round.

In his sixteenth fight, with a record of 15–0 (12 KO), he faced Emmanuel Anim for the vacant Commonwealth light-heavyweight title on 12 October 2019, at the First Direct Arena, Leeds. In a fight which saw Arthur go beyond six rounds for the first time in his professional career, he dropped his opponent in the fourth round en route to a unanimous decision victory, with the judges' scorecards reading 117–111, 117–110 and 115–113.

Arthur was scheduled to defend his title against Anthony Yarde on 11 April 2020, however due to the COVID-19 pandemic, the fight was rescheduled to 5 December 2020.

On 5 December 2020, Arthur defeated Yarde via Split Decision to retain his Commonwealth light- heavyweight title and win the vacant WBO Inter-Continental light-heavyweight title.

On 4 December 2021 Yarde defeated Arthur in the rematch via knockout in the 4th round.

Personal life
Arthur comes from a fighting family, being a cousin of Commonwealth super-featherweight champion Zelfa Barrett and former British, European and world title challenger Pat Barrett, who is also his trainer.

Professional boxing record

References

External links

Lyndon Arthur profile at Frank Warren Promotions

Living people
1991 births
Boxers from Manchester
English male boxers
Light-heavyweight boxers
Commonwealth Boxing Council champions